Goldmont is a microarchitecture for low-power Atom, Celeron and Pentium branded processors used in systems on a chip (SoCs) made by Intel. They allow only one thread per core.

The Apollo Lake platform with 14 nm Goldmont core was unveiled at the Intel Developer Forum (IDF) in Shenzhen, China,  April 2016. The Goldmont architecture borrows heavily from the Skylake Core processors, so it offers a more than 30 percent performance boost compared to the previous Braswell platform, and it can be used to implement power-efficient low-end devices including Cloudbooks, 2-in-1 netbooks, small PCs, IP cameras, and in-car entertainment systems.

Design
Goldmont is the 2nd generation out-of-order low-power Atom  microarchitecture designed for the entry level desktop and notebook computers. Goldmont is built on the 14 nm manufacturing process and supports up to four cores for the consumer devices. It includes the Intel Gen9 graphics architecture introduced with the Skylake.

The Goldmont microarchitecture builds on the success of the Silvermont microarchitecture, and provides the following enhancements:

 An out-of-order execution engine with a 3-wide superscalar pipeline. Specifically:
 The decoder can decode 3 instructions per cycle.
 The microcode sequencer can send 3 µops per cycle for allocation into the reservation stations.
Retirement supports a peak rate of 3 per cycle.
 Enhancement in branch prediction which de-couples the fetch pipeline from the instruction decoder.
 Larger out-of-order execution window and buffers that enable deeper out-of-order execution across integer, FP/SIMD, and memory instruction types.
 Fully out-of-order memory execution and disambiguation. The Goldmont microarchitecture can execute one load and one store per cycle (compared to one load or one store per cycle in the Silvermont microarchitecture). The memory execution pipeline also includes a second level TLB enhancement with 512 entries for 4KB pages.
 Integer execution cluster in the Goldmont microarchitecture provides three pipelines and can execute up to three simple integer ALU operations per cycle.
 SIMD integer and floating-point instructions execute in a 128-bit wide engine. Throughput and latency of many instructions have improved, including PSHUFB with 1-cycle throughput (versus 5 cycles for Silvermont microarchitecture) and many other SIMD instructions with doubled throughput.
 Throughput and latency of instructions for accelerating encryption/decryption (AES) and carry-less multiplication (PCLMULQDQ) have been improved significantly in the Goldmont microarchitecture.
 The Goldmont microarchitecture provides new instructions with hardware accelerated secure hashing algorithm, SHA1 and SHA256.
 The Goldmont microarchitecture also adds support for the RDSEED instruction for random number generation meeting the NIST SP800-90C standard.
 PAUSE instruction latency is optimized to enable better power efficiency.

Technology

 A 14 nm manufacturing process
 System on chip architecture
 3D tri-gate transistors
 Consumer chips up to quad-cores
 Supports SSE4.2 instruction set
 Supports Intel AESNI and PCLMUL instructions
 Supports Intel RDRAND and RDSEED instructions
 Supports Intel SHA extensions
 Supports Intel MPX (Memory Protection Extensions)
 Gen 9 Intel HD Graphics with DirectX 12, OpenGL 4.6 with latest Windows 10 driver update (OpenGL 4.5 on Linux), OpenGL ES 3.2 and OpenCL 2.0 support. 
 HEVC Main10 & VP9 Profile0 hardware decoding support
 10 W thermal design power (TDP) Desktop or Server processors
 4.0 to 6.0 W TDP mobile processors
 eMMC 5.0 technology to connect to NAND flash storage 
 USB 3.1 & USB-C specification
 Support for DDR3L, LPDDR3, and LPDDR4 memory
 Integrated Sensor Hub (ISH) which can sample and combine data from individual sensors and operate independently when the host platform is in a low power state
 Image Signal Processor (ISP) supporting four concurrent camera streams
 Audio controller supporting HD Audio and LPE Audio
 Trusted Execution Engine 3.0 security subsystem

Erratum 
Similar to previous Silvermont generation design flaws were found in processor circuitry resulting in cease of operation when processors are actively used for several years. Errata named APL46 "System May Experience Inability to Boot or May Cease Operation" was added to documentation in June 2017 stating that low pin count (LPC), real time clock (RTC), SD card and GPIO interfaces may stop functioning.

Mitigations were found to limit impact on systems. Firmware update for the LPC bus called LPC_CLKRUN# reduces the utilization of the LPC interface which in turn decreases (but does not eliminate) LPC bus degradation – some systems are however not compatible with this new firmware. It is recommended not to use SD card as a boot device and to remove the card from the system when not in use, other possible solution being using only UHS-I cards and operating them at 1.8 V.

Congatec also states the issues impact USB buses and eMMC, although those are not mentioned in Intel's public documentation. USB should have a maximum of 12% active time and there is a 60TB transmit traffic life expectancy over the lifetime of the port. eMMC should have a maximum of 33% active time and should be set to D3 device low power state by the operating system when not in use. Newer designs such as Atom C3000 Denverton do not seem to be affected.

List of Goldmont processors

Desktop processors (Apollo Lake) 
List of desktop processors as follows:

Server processors (Denverton)

Mobile processors (Apollo Lake) 
List of mobile processors as follows:

Embedded processors (Apollo Lake) 
List of embedded processors as follows:

Automotive processors (Apollo Lake) 
There is also an Atom A3900 series exclusively for automotive customers with AEC-Q100 qualification:

Tablet processors (Willow Trail) 
Willow Trail platform was canceled. Apollo Lake will be offered instead.

See also
List of Intel CPU microarchitectures
List of Intel Pentium microprocessors
List of Intel Celeron microprocessors
List of Intel Atom microprocessors
Atom (system on chip)

References

Intel x86 microprocessors
Intel microarchitectures
X86 microarchitectures